Red Sonja is a Marvel comic book character.

Red Sonja may also refer to :

Red Sonja (1985 film), 1985 film with Brigitte Nielsen
Red Sonja (upcoming film), upcoming American film based on Red Sonya of Rogatino
Red Sonya of Rogatino, in Robert E. Howard's The Shadow of the Vulture (1934)
Red Sonja: Queen of Plagues, 2016 animated film
Ursula Kuczynski (1907-2000) German communist spy codenamed "Sonja"

See also
Red Sonja Unconquered, Dungeons & Dragons module